The 2016 TCR International Series was the second season of the TCR International Series.

Stefano Comini successfully defended his title, beating his nearest challenger James Nash by 2.5 points. Craft-Bamboo Racing were crowned teams' champions beating Leopard Racing with 73 points margin, while Seat Léon TCR won the models' championship.

Teams and drivers
Michelin is the official tyre supplier, but Neric Wei, Tang Chi Lun and Edgar Lau used Yokohama tyres at Macau.

Calendar
The 2016 schedule was announced on 2 December 2015, with twelve events scheduled. Three out of these twelve rounds are to be held supporting Formula One. The calendar was subsequently modified: the Shanghai round was canceled and replaced by Buriram (originally scheduled to be held on 30 October). On 5 May the Italian round was moved to Imola.

Results

Fan Award
Starting from this year, the Man of the Race is replaced by the Fan Award. At the end of every weekend, a panel consisting of the International Series’ Promoter and the promotional and media team name two candidates who stood out during the event for a particular reason.

Championship standings

Drivers' championship

† – Drivers did not finish the race, but were classified as they completed over 75% of the race distance.

Teams' Championship 

† – Drivers did not finish the race, but were classified as they completed over 75% of the race distance.

Model of the year

† – Drivers did not finish the race, but were classified as they completed over 75% of the race distance.

OMP Trophy
All drivers displaying an OMP are eligible for the  OMP Trophy. Points are awarded for championships and the use of OMP safety equipment. At the end of the season, the top four drivers win a cash prize.

References

External links
 

 
2016
International Series